Holy Island ('the island of (Saint) Cybi') is an island on the western side of the larger Isle of Anglesey, Wales, from which it is separated by the Cymyran Strait. It is called "Holy" because of the high concentration of standing stones, burial chambers, and other religious sites on the small island. The alternative English name of the island is Holyhead Island. According to the 2011 UK Census, the population was 13,659, of which 11,431 (84%) lived in the largest town, Holyhead.

History

Irish pirates invaded Anglesey following the end of Roman rule in Britannia. Cunedda first began warfare against the Irish but ultimately Cadwallon Lawhir defeated the Irish on Holy Island.

Natural features
There are a variety of natural habitats on the island including mudflats, dunes, marshes, and beaches. Practically nothing is left of the oak forest that covered almost all of the island before the arrival of Neolithic farmers. Just off the coast by the mountain are located two islands North Stack and South Stack, upon the latter stands a lighthouse.

Whilst most of the coastline is rocky there are sandy beaches at Trearddur Bay and Penrhos Country Park. Due to the rocky nature the island has seen more of its fair share of shipwrecks through the years. The coastal zone between the island and the mainland of Anglesey is a large site of special scientific interest – Beddmanarch–Cymyran.

Transport

Holy Island is connected to Anglesey by two road links. The first, the Stanley Embankment, is made up of causeways carrying the A5 and A55. The second is the much older original link, Four Mile Bridge. The Stanley Embankment also carries the North Wales Coast Line which terminates at the island's only railway station, in Holyhead. The Port of Holyhead has passenger and freight ferries which travel to Dublin Port, Ireland. Buses from the island run to Amlwch, Llangefni and Bangor amongst other places.

Around  of the  Anglesey Coastal Path is on Holy Island. National Cycle Route 5 and National Cycle Route 8 traverse the island. The nearest airport is Anglesey Airport a few miles away on the Anglesey mainland and provides daily flights to Cardiff.

Sport & Tourism

There are three association football teams in the Welsh football league system on the island, Holyhead Hotspur, Caergybi and Trearddur Bay. The New Oval ground is home to the Ynys Môn football team and hosted the finals of the 2019 Inter Games Football Tournament. There is also a rugby union side and a golf course. Holyhead Park contains lawn bowling greens, three public tennis courts and a skate park. Like the rest of Anglesey, owing to its exposed location in the Irish Sea, surfing is popular.

Many people staying on Holy Island do so short term whilst waiting for the ferries to Dublin Port. As such the largest hotels (Travelodge and Premier Inn) are located close to the A5/A55 roads. Centred in Holyhead but dotted around the island (especially Trearddur Bay and Rhoscolyn) are quite a number of smaller bed and breakfast hotels and caravan parks for people who may wish to stay longer. Attractions in the area include South Stack Lighthouse and the RSPB reserve close by, the Breakwater Country Park, the RNLI museum and walks up Holyhead Mountain.

Schools and Governance

There are six primary schools and one secondary school, Ysgol Uwchradd Caergybi, which lays claim to being the first Comprehensive school in England & Wales.

Along with the rest of Anglesey Holy Island is part of the Ynys Môn UK Parliament constituency and the Ynys Môn Senedd constituency. At a local level it is run by Isle of Anglesey County Council. Holy Island returns 6 of the 30 councillors to the county council, 3 for Caergybi (Holyhead town centre and surrounds) and 3 for Ynys Gybi (the southern extremes of Holyhead town and the more rural south). Holyhead Town Council is made up of seven electoral wards who return 16 councillors and appoint a mayor and deputy mayor annually.

References

External links
Holy Island protected site